Chambers Lake may refer to:

Chambers Lake (Colorado)
Chambers Lake (New York)
Chambers Lake (Thurston County, Washington)